The  1985-86 Turkish First Football League season had 19 clubs participating. Beşiktaş J.K. won the championship.  Galatasaray finished the season undefeated, however finished second on goal difference.

League table

Results

References

Turkey - List of final tables (RSSSF)

Süper Lig seasons
1985–86 in Turkish football
Turkey